Champion Lodge was a large house at Camberwell in London.

History
The lodge was built at the foot of Denmark Hill by Thomas de Crespigny in 1717. Philip Champion de Crespigny (1704 - 1765) began leasing the house around 1741 and purchased it in 1755, renaming it Champion Lodge. The Prince of Wales visited the lodge in 1804 and Claude Champion de Crespigny (1734 - 1818), son of Philip, the then owner of the house, was made a baronet in 1805.

The lodge, which was originally surrounded by a 30-acre park, was demolished in 1841. It was roughly at the junction of where Love Walk meets Denmark Hill today.

References

Former houses in the London Borough of Southwark
Former buildings and structures in the London Borough of Southwark
Buildings and structures demolished in 1841
Demolished buildings and structures in London